U.S. Route 411 (US 411) is an alternate parallel-highway associated with US 11. US 411 travels through northeastern Alabama, northwestern Georgia, and southeastern Tennessee. It is signed north-south, as with most highways that have odd numbers, but the route runs primarily in a northeast-southwest direction, and covers a more east-west mileage than it does north-south. Notable towns and cities along its route include Gadsden, Alabama; Rome, Georgia; Cartersville, Georgia; Maryville, Tennessee; Sevierville, Tennessee, and Newport, Tennessee.

US 411 and US 11 never intersect with one another, though they come very close in various places including Leeds, Alabama, Gadsden, Alabama, and Maryville, Tennessee. US 411 also spends much of its route close to the Interstate Highway System: Interstate 20 (I-20), I-40, I-75, and I-59, though it never has an interchange with I-59.

Most of the terrain through which US 411 passes is rural countryside, with no major metropolitan areas directly along its route. However, it does pass relatively near the major cities of Birmingham, Alabama, Chattanooga, Tennessee and Knoxville, Tennessee. In Sevier County, Tennessee, south of Knoxville, US 411 is used by many tourists as a route to the northern side of the Great Smoky Mountains National Park. Although US 411 has a south–north designation, it contains long stretches that are west–east, and its overall direction is actually southwest–northeast.

US 411 is generally a two-lane highway through the countryside. However, it has long been a four-lane, divided highway connecting Rome and Cartersville, Georgia, and it is a multi-lane highway connecting Cartersville with I-75. Also, for part of its route in the Cartersville area, US 411 shares a four-lane, divided highway with US 41. Furthermore, the Tennessee Department of Transportation completed a project to widen the highway to four lanes between Maryville and Ocoee, Tennessee, and between Chestnut Hill and Newport, Tennessee.

Route description

|-
|AL
|
|-
|GA
|
|-
|TN
|
|-
|Total
|
|}

Alabama
US 411 begins at US 78 (Parkway Drive) in the city of Leeds in far eastern Jefferson County. SR 25, the U.S. Highway's companion route, continues south as a signed highway that briefly follows US 78 east before splitting south toward Harpersville; however, mileposts along US 411 in Alabama generally reflect SR 25. US 411 heads north along two-lane 9th Street, which has a pair of at-grade crossings of Norfolk Southern Railway rail lines. The street's name changes to Whitmire Street, which the U.S. Highway follows to Ashville Road. US 411 follows Ashville Road, a two-lane road with center turn lane, northeast into St. Clair County, where the highway expands to four lanes. The U.S. Highway meets I-20 at a partial cloverleaf interchange as it leaves the city of Leeds. US 411 continues as two-lane Moody Parkway northeast through the Cahaba Valley formed by the Little Cahaba River between Pine Ridge to the west and Oak Ridge to the east. The highway has a brief concurrency with SR 174 through Odenville, where the highways pass under a CSX rail line.

US 411 continues northeast through the Beaver Creek Valley between Pine Ridge and the Beaver Creek Mountains. The highway leaves the valley after it joins US 231 (Heart of Dixie Highway) to pass through Pine Ridge to the city of Ashville. The U.S. Highways enter town along 5th Street and proceed to the county courthouse, where they meet the eastern end of SR 23 (6th Avenue). Both highways turn east onto 6th Avenue, then US-231 turns north onto Court Street East. US 411 leaves Ashville along Rainbow Drive, which heads northeast between Big Canoe Creek and Canoe Creek Mountain to the south. The U.S. Highway crosses the mountain and enters Etowah County where it crosses the Big Canoe Creek branch of Neely Henry Lake. US 411 follows the western flank of Dunaway mountain to Rainbow City, where the route intersects SR 77 (Grand Avenue).

US 411 expands to a four-lane divided highway as it enters the city of Gadsden. The highway crosses the Big Wills Creek branch of Neely Henry Lake and meets the eastern end of I-759 at a partial cloverleaf interchange; that freeway continues east as SR 759. US 411 veers onto Albert Rains Boulevard, which follows the right bank of the Coosa River through downtown Gadsden. The highway passes by the Spirit of American Citizenship Monument and under Broad Street, a CSX rail line, and US 278 and US 431 (Meighan Boulevard), which access US 411 via a partial cloverleaf interchange. US 411 leaves (or will soon exit) Gadsden along a newly constructed four-lane divided highway that passes between Shinbone Ridge to the west and several loops of the Coosa River. The U.S. Highway drops to two lanes before it enters Cherokee County, then expands again to a four-lane divided highway, Weiss Lake Boulevard.

US 411 curves east along the northern edge of Weiss Lake and intersects SR 68 (Industrial Boulevard) in the town of Leesburg, east of which US 411 and SR 68 cross the lake, an impoundment of the Coosa River. Shortly after entering the city of Centre, the U.S. Highway and state highway turn onto the Clarence E. Chestnut Jr. Bypass, a four-lane road with center turn lane; US 411 Business and SR 25 continue along Main Street into the center of town. SR 68 diverges from the U.S. Highway at Cedar Bluff Road, which carries SR 283 southwest toward downtown. SR 283 becomes US 411's companion route on the bypass, which next intersects SR 9 (Armory Road), which intersects SR 68 immediately to the north. US 411 drops to two lanes east of SR 9 and curves south to collect the east end of US 411 Business (Main Street) and SR 25 on the eastern edge of Centre. US 411 continues east and crosses Cowan Creek before reaching the Alabama–Georgia state line and the northern terminus of SR 25 east of the hamlet of Forney.

Georgia

US 411 enters Georgia at the western terminus of its companion SR 53 in the southwestern corner of Floyd County. The two-lane highway, which is named Gadsden Road, has a brief concurrency with SR 100, which heads north as Fosters Mill Road and south as Mill Street, on the west side of the town of Cave Spring. US 411 enters town along Alabama Street and leaves to the northeast along Rome Street. The U.S. Highway continues as Cave Spring Road, which crosses Cedar Creek and passes through Vans Valley. US 411 passes under the West Rome Bypass and intersects US 27 and SR 1 (Cedartown Highway), which US 411 joins heading north. The four-lane road with center turn lane passes along the west side of Lindale and between Walker Mountain and Booze Mountain on the west and east, respectively.

US 411 and US 27 expand to a divided highway as they enter the city of Rome and then a four-lane freeway as they cross over a Norfolk Southern rail line. The freeway has a diamond interchange with Darlington Drive and Old Lindale Road and a half-diamond interchange with Maple Road. Immediately to the east of the second interchange, US 411 passes through a directional T interchange; US 27, SR 1, SR 20, and SR 53 head north toward downtown Rome and US 411 and SR 20 head east. Immediately to the east of the split, the U.S. Highway has a partial cloverleaf interchange with SR 101 (Dean Avenue); there is no ramp from SR 101 to westbound US 411. The freeway ends east of SR 101. US 411 has an intersection with the southern end of SR 1 Loop (East Rome Bypass) before leaving the city limits.

US 411 heads east along Cartersville Highway into Bartow County. The four-lane divided highway parallels and then crosses the Etowah River. US 411 crosses over an east–west CSX rail line immediately before its trumpet interchange with US 41 and SR 3 (Joe Frank Harris Parkway). The two U.S. Highways head southeast into the city of Cartersville then diverge immediately to the east of a north–south CSX rail line at the boulevard's partial cloverleaf interchange with SR 61 (Tennessee Street). Immediately to the north of the interchange, SR 20 (Canton Highway) splits east and SR 61 becomes US 411's companion highway toward Tennessee. The U.S. Highway heads north as a four-lane undivided highway that becomes divided temporarily through the highway's partial cloverleaf interchange with I-75 (Larry McDonald Memorial Highway).

US 411 drops to two lanes south of the town of White, where the highway begins to closely parallel the north–south CSX rail line. The U.S. Highway intersects SR 140 (Henry Mack Hill Road) in the hamlet of Rydal before entering Gordon County. US 411 passes through the town of Fairmount as Salacoa Street; the U.S. Highway runs concurrently with SR 53 between Calhoun Street and Fairmount Highway. North of the town of Ranger, through which the route is named Tennessee Highway, the highway meets the eastern end of SR 156 (Red Bud Road). US 411 passes through the town of Oakman, then diverges from a road called Old Highway 411, crosses to the west side of the railroad, intersects SR 136 (Nicklesville Road), and enters Murray County. The U.S. Highway passes to the west of Reregulation Reservoir and Carters Lake, both impoundments of the Coosawattee River, which the highway crosses to the west of the lakes.

US 411 intersects US 76 and SR 282, which follow part of Old Highway 411 before heading east through the Cohutta Mountains, and the U.S. Highways begin to run concurrently as a four-lane undivided highway along the west flank of Fort Mountain. US 411 and US 76 continue as 3rd Avenue through the city of Chatsworth. In the center of town, the highways intersect Fort Street, which carries SR 2 and SR 52 east toward Fort Mountain and State Route 52 Alternate to the west. At the north end of town, US 76 and SR 52 leave US 411 along G.I. Maddox Boulevard. The U.S. Highway passes along the west flank of Camp Ground Mountain and is named Hill Street through the town of Eton, where the route meets the eastern end of SR 286 (Coffey Road) and drops to two lanes. US 411 passes through the town of Crandall, crosses to the east side of the railroad, and follows the Fairy Valley to the hamlet of Cisco, where SR 2 splits to the west. US 411 crosses over to the west side of the rail line in the hamlet of Tennga immediately before reaching the Georgia–Tennessee state line, where SR 61 has its northern terminus.

Tennessee

US 411 enters Tennessee at the southern terminus of its companion SR 33 in the southwestern corner of Polk County. The highway crosses the Conasauga River in the hamlet of Conasauga and meets the eastern end of SR 313 (Ladd Springs Road) in Oldfort. US 411 parallels the CSX rail line through the hamlet of Ocoee, where the highway expands to four lanes plus a center turn lane and has a partial cloverleaf interchange with US 64 and US 74 (SR 40). North of Ocoee, US 411 crosses over the railroad and the Ocoee River and passes through the town of Benton, where the route meets the northern end of SR 314 (Parksville Road). The U.S. Highway expands to a divided highway north of the town. US 411 intersects and begins to run concurrently with SR 30, crosses the Hiwassee River, passes by Hiwassee/Ocoee Scenic River State Park, and meets the eastern end of SR 163 in the village of Delano.

US 411 becomes undivided and crosses over the CSX rail line shortly after entering McMinn County. In the town of Etowah, the highway follows Tennessee Avenue, meets the western end of SR 310 (Mecca Pike), and SR 30 splits west along David M. Lilliard Memorial Highway. The highway becomes divided once again north of town and continues through farmland and countryside before becoming undivided once again before entering the town of Englewood and goes through town passing just east of the downtown area and intersecting and having a short concurrency with SR 39 (Athens Pike; Tellico Street). US 411 then becomes a divided highway again as it leaves Englewood and enters countryside once again before crossing into Monroe County.

US 411 continues through countryside before entering the city of Madisonville and becomes undivided for a short distance before having an intersection with its former alignment, which travels through downtown (Old US Highway 411), before becoming divided and having a partial cloverleaf interchange with SR 68 (New Highway 68), which provides access to Sweetwater, The Lost Sea, Tellico Plains, Cherohala Skyway and the Cherokee National Forest, before going along a bypass of downtown as a divided highway passing through a major business district. US 411 then has a grade-separated interchange with its former alignment (Warren Street) before becoming undivided before leaving Madisonville and continuing north as a 4-lane divided highway through farmland and countryside. US 411 then comes to an intersection and becomes concurrent with SR 72 (Loudon Highway) just before entering the town of Vonore and becoming undivided once again as this time it passes straight through downtown instead of bypassing it. It has an intersection SR 360, which provides access to Fort Loudoun and Fort Loudoun State Park, before leaving Vonore via crossing a bridge over the Little Tennessee River/Tellico Lake before SR 72 splits off and goes east following the banks of the lake before becoming divided once again before crossing into Loudon County.

It then becomes undivided shortly afterwards though it doesn't pass by any businesses or towns as it stays in farmland as it becomes known as Greenback Road. It then passes just south of the community of Greenback and meeting the southern end of SR 95, which provides access to the community. US 411 then continues through countryside and farmland to cross into Blount County.

US 411 continues through farmland as an undivided 4-lane highway and has an intersection with SR 336 northeast of the community of Lanier. It then continues through farmland before entering the city of Maryville and becoming concurrent with US 129 (SR 115) (Calderwood Highway; provides access to Calderwood, Tallassee, and the Tail of the Dragon) and pass by a few businesses before really entering the business district at the intersection with SR 335 (William Blount Drive). They continue through a major business district before coming to grade-separated interchange where US 411 and US 129 split with US 129 bypassing downtown to enter Alcoa and provide access to McGhee Tyson Airport and Knoxville and US 411 continues north into downtown next to Foothills Mall. US 411 continues into downtown, as Broadway Avenue, and comes to an intersection with US 321 (SR 73) (Lamar Alexander Parkway; provides access to Walland, Townsend, Wears Valley, and Great Smoky Mountains National Park). It then has another intersection with SR 336 before traveling through the center and most historic part of the city before coming to an intersection with SR 35 (Hall Road/Washington Street), with SR 33 continuing north to Knoxville and US 411 turning right to become concurrent with SR 35 (its new companion route). It follows Washington Street for a short distance before turning left onto Sevierville Road, at an intersection with SR 447 (Washington Street), and leaves downtown. It then passes by Blount Memorial Hospital before going through some neighborhoods before leaving Maryville and continues as a narrow 2-lane highway through countryside and farmland and crosses the Little River in the community of Wildwood. It then continues through countryside and farmland, passing by 411 Speedway, before entering the city of Seymour and Sevier County.

US 411 goes through some Seymour neighborhoods for about a mile and a half before coming to an intersection with US 441 (SR 71; Chapman Highway; provides access to Knoxville) and SR 338 (Boyds Creek Highway; provides access to Kodak and Douglas Dam), with US 411/SR 35 turning right to become concurrent with US 441/SR 71 and continue as an undivided 4-lane highway through Seymour before leaving Seymour and traversing the Slate Knobs, the eastern foothills of Chilhowee Mountain, and becoming narrow and curvy while maintaining 4 lanes throughout. After several miles it widens to a 4-lane divided highway and stays that until it enters the city of Sevierville where it becomes undivided once again. From Seymour to Sevierville, US 411 is northbound and US 441 is southbound as the road runs east. (Highway route signs once gave the conflicting directions.) The route crosses the Pigeon River and enters downtown at the intersection with SR 66 (Winfield Dunn Parkway; provides access to I-40), where US 441/SR 71 splits southward, as Forks of the River Parkway, to go to Pigeon Forge, Gatlinburg, and the Great Smoky Mountains National Park. US 411/SR 35 continue through downtown as Main Street and has an intersection with SR 448 (North Parkway/Parkway) before leaving downtown at the crossing of Middle Creek, where it transitions to Dolly Parton Parkway. It continues through a major business district and has an intersection with SR 449 (Veterans Boulevard; provides access to Dollywood and Pigeon Forge). It then passes by some more businesses before leaving Sevierville and entering the community of Cherokee Hills, near the intersection with SR 416 (Pittman Center Road; provides access to Pittman Center and Gatlinburg). It then has an intersection with SR 339 (Long Springs Road; provides access to Cosby) before leaving Cherokee Hills and narrowing to an improved 2-lane Highway. It then passes through the community of New Center before having a sharp switchback and becoming narrow before crossing into Jefferson County.

After crossing the county line, US 411 immediately enters the community of Chestnut Hill and has an intersection with SR 92 next to the Bush Bean Museum, which also right across the road from the Bush Brothers and Company Cannery plant and corporate headquarters. US 411 then enters some mountains and becomes curvy for a short distance before widening to a new 4-lane divided highway just before crossing into Cocke County.

It continues along the new 4-lane highway into the city of Newport and ends at its national northern terminus at an intersection with US 25W/US 70 (SR 9) just a short distance away from that route's interchange with I-40 (Exit 432 A-B; though exit 432 A is only signed as US 411 on the interstate in both directions), with SR 35 turning right to become concurrent with, though unsigned, that route towards downtown.

National Highway System
The following portions of US 411 are part of the National Highway System, a system of routes determined to be the most important for the nation's economy, mobility, and defense:
From the southern part of Rainbow City, Alabama, through Gadsden, to a point southwest of Turkey Town
From the southern end of the US 27/SR 1 concurrency in Six Mile, Georgia, through Rome and Cartersville, to McCallie
The entire length of the US 76 concurrency, from south-southeast of Chatsworth, into the city
From the Georgia–Tennessee state line, in Tennga, to the bridge over the Little River, northeast of Maryville, Tennessee

Major intersections

See also

References

External links

 Endpoints of U.S. Highway 411

11-4
11-4
11-4
11-4
4